Alan Westaway (born 17 February 1969) is a British actor and screenwriter, best known for playing Nick Slater in The Bill from 1995 to 1997.

Career
Westaway also appeared in two episodes of series 4 of Two Pints of Lager and a Packet of Crisps playing Phillip and also EastEnders in 2004. He transitioned into screenwriting for British television, writing Stan Lee's Lucky Man and the second series of Sky's medical thriller Temple.

References

External links
 

1969 births
Living people
British male television actors
British male television writers